Yannathan is a bounded rural locality in Victoria, Australia,  south-east of Melbourne's central business district, located within the Shire of Cardinia local government area. Yannathan recorded a population of 272 at the 2021 census.

History

Yannathan Post Office opened on 15 September 1884 and closed in 1959.

See also
 City of Cranbourne – Yannathan was previously within this former local government area.

References

Shire of Cardinia